Víctor Cano Segura (born 10 February 1978) is a Spanish gymnast. He competed at the 2000 Summer Olympics and the 2004 Summer Olympics.

References

External links
 
 
 

1978 births
Living people
Spanish male artistic gymnasts
Olympic gymnasts of Spain
Gymnasts at the 2000 Summer Olympics
Gymnasts at the 2004 Summer Olympics
Gymnasts from Barcelona
Mediterranean Games gold medalists for Spain
Mediterranean Games silver medalists for Spain
Mediterranean Games bronze medalists for Spain
Mediterranean Games medalists in gymnastics
Competitors at the 2001 Mediterranean Games
Competitors at the 2005 Mediterranean Games